Hugh Evelyn-White (1884, Ipswich - 1924) was a classicist, egyptologist, coptologist and archaeologist. In 1907 he graduated with a degree in classics from Wadham College. He is noted for his many translations of ancient Greek works, most notable being those of Hesiod and the Homeric hymns. He served in the  British Army in the Middle East during WWI as an officer but was invalided out in 1917. He worked on the excavations in Egypt and he returned to England in 1922 to work at as a lecturer at the University of Leeds but took  his own life in 1924.

He was the son of the antiquarian, Charles Harold Evelyn-White, and his wife, Charlotte Reid.

Selected publications 
 Evelyn-White, H. G. (Ed.). (1914). Hesiod, the Homeric hymns, and Homerica (No. 57). Harvard University Press.
 Evelyn-White, H. G. (1910). The Myth of the Nostoi. The Classical Review, 24(7), 201-205.
 Evelyn-White, H. G. (1915). Hesiodea. The Classical Quarterly, 9(2), 72-76.
 Crum, W. E., & Evelyn-White, H. G. (1926). The monastery of Epiphanius at Thebes/Pt. 2 Coptic ostraca and papyri/ed. with translations and commentaries by WE Crum. The monastery of Epiphanius at Thebes.
 Evelyn White, H. G. (1920). The Egyptian Expedition 1916-1919: IV. The Monasteries of the Wadi Natrun. Bulletin of the Metropolitan Museum of Art, 34-39.

Other sources 
 Atiya, Aziz Suryal, Lola Atiya, and S. Michael Saad. 2011. Claremont Coptic encyclopedia: Evelyn-White, Hugh Gerard (1874-1924) . Claremont, Calif: Claremont Colleges Digital Library. https://ccdl.claremont.edu/digital/collection/cce/id/827/
 Dawson, Warren Royal. 1972. "Who was who in Egyptology",  London: Egypt Exploration Society.
 Kammerer, Winifred, Elinor M. Husselman, and Louise Adele Shier. 1969. A coptic bibliography. New York: Kraus.

References

1884 births
1924 deaths
British classical scholars
20th-century philologists
English archaeologists
English Egyptologists
Alumni of Wadham College, Oxford
20th-century archaeologists
Tutankhamun